Oxametacin (or oxamethacin) is a non-steroidal anti-inflammatory drug.

References 

Tryptamines
Hydroxamic acids
Phenol ethers
Chloroarenes
Benzamides
Nonsteroidal anti-inflammatory drugs